The Stentor Alliance was a formal alliance of Canada's major telecommunications companies, specifically its incumbent local exchange carriers.  It derives its name from the Greek mythological figure Stentor.

Formed in 1992 to succeed Telecom Canada (which was previously known as the Trans-Canada Telephone System, and before that as the Telephone Association of Canada), the alliance comprised the following companies at the time of inception:

 Alberta Government Telephones, now Telus
 BC Tel, now part of Telus
 Bell Canada
 Island Telephone Company, now part of Bell Aliant
 Manitoba Telephone System, now Manitoba Telecom Services Bell MTS
 Maritime Telephone and Telegraph Company, now part of Bell Aliant
 NBTel, now part of Bell Aliant
 Newfoundland Telephone, now part of Bell Aliant
 Northwestel (associate member)
 Québec Téléphone, now part of Telus (associate member)
 SaskTel (Saskatchewan Telecommunications)

The Trans-Canada and Telecom Canada alliances were ostensibly formed to provide for the standardization of local and long-distance telephone services across Canada as well as provide for consistency in lobbying efforts with provincial and federal governments. By the time Stentor replaced Telecom Canada, internet service was part of the alliance's objectives.

In practice, Stentor was also an advertising unit, coordinating national advertising and sponsorships (such as sponsorship of the Olympic Games). The nine full member companies also participated in revenue pooling, and could quickly introduce new services to all nine members. Other telephone companies had to negotiate with Stentor or its predecessors to offer such services as 800 and 900 service.

The alliance controlled the following organizations:

 Stentor Resource Centre Inc. (SRCI)
 Stentor Telecom Policy Inc. (STPI)
 Stentor Canadian Network Management (SCNM)
 Signature Service Centre (SSC)

On January 1, 1999, SRCI and SSC were disbanded and their roles reassumed by their parent organizations, with SCNM remaining in place in a modified form. STPI was dissolved in 2004 after its role had also diminished as the companies took divergent paths.  At time of dissolution, about 1,800 people were employed by Stentor.

Many of the Stentor companies have since become competitors, with several joining with Stentor's former competitors (Sprint, Rogers). Bell - the parent of Aliant, NorthwesTel, Télébec and Northern Telephone - almost immediately entered competition with Telus; Bell's ties with SaskTel have also weakened since then.

References

Telecommunications companies of Canada